John Gough Waller ( - 1903) was an Australian politician.

He was one of Charles Cowper's 21 appointments to the New South Wales Legislative Council in May 1861, but did not take his seat. He stood as a candidate for Patrick's Plains at the 1864–65 election, and the 1865 Canterbury by-election, but was unsuccessful on both occasions.

Waller had married Anne Agar Hansard on 10 September 1842. He died on 11 July 1903 aged 84 years.

References

Year of birth uncertain
1903 deaths
Members of the New South Wales Legislative Council